David Zilberman may refer to:

 David Zilberman (wrestler) (born 1982), Canadian Olympic freestyle wrestler
 David B. Zilberman (1938–1977), Russian-American philosopher and sociologist
 David Zilberman (economist) (born 1947), Israeli-American economist and professor